Logan Center School No.5 is a historic one-room schoolhouse located south of Dickens, Iowa, United States. The property was bought for a school in 1894 for $20, and the building was constructed the following year.  Enrollment here averaged between 25 and 30 students until the 1930s when it started to decline.  The school was closed in 1941 when it was incorporated into the Gillett Grove Consolidated School.  The building is located in the center of Logan Township.  Because the township has no incorporated communities the school building has functions as a township hall, a polling place, and hosts other community events.  The building was also used for worship services and religious instruction.  The original privy remains in the back, but a woodshed that was part of the historical nomination has subsequently been removed. The schoolhouse and privy were listed together on the National Register of Historic Places in 2001.

References

School buildings completed in 1895
One-room schoolhouses in Iowa
Defunct schools in Iowa
Buildings and structures in Clay County, Iowa
National Register of Historic Places in Clay County, Iowa
School buildings on the National Register of Historic Places in Iowa
Vernacular architecture in Iowa